The Tuivawl is a river of Mizoram, northeastern India.  It flows in a northerly direction.

Geography
It raises near Chhawrtui village and later joins Barak River.

References

Rivers of Mizoram
Rivers of India